Pauridioneura is a genus of moths of the family Yponomeutidae.

Species
Pauridioneura acrospila - Turner, 1926 

Yponomeutidae